Tímea Babos and Sloane Stephens were the defending champions, but they chose to not participate this year.

Irina Khromacheva and Maryna Zanevska won the tournament, defeating Victoria Kan and Demi Schuurs in the final, 6–4, 7–5.

Seeds

Draw

Finals

Top half

Bottom half

References 
 Main draw

Girls' Doubles
French Open, 2011 Girls' Doubles